Yefimovsky (masculine), Yefimovskaya (feminine), or Yefimovskoye (neuter) is the name of several inhabited localities in Russia.

Urban localities
Yefimovsky (urban-type settlement), an urban-type settlement in Yefimovskoye Settlement Municipal Formation of Boksitogorsky District, Leningrad Oblast

Rural localities
Yefimovskoye, Kostroma Oblast, a village in Sudayskoye Settlement of Chukhlomsky District of Kostroma Oblast
Yefimovskoye, Yaroslavl Oblast, a village in Novinkovsky Rural Okrug of Pervomaysky District of Yaroslavl Oblast
Yefimovskaya, Arkhangelsk Oblast, a village in Berezonavolotsky Selsoviet of Krasnoborsky District of Arkhangelsk Oblast
Yefimovskaya, Sverdlovsk Oblast, a village in Taborinsky District of Sverdlovsk Oblast
Yefimovskaya, Vladimir Oblast, a village in Sudogodsky District of Vladimir Oblast
Yefimovskaya, Tarnogsky District, Vologda Oblast, a village in Verkhnekokshengsky Selsoviet of Tarnogsky District of Vologda Oblast
Yefimovskaya, Vozhegodsky District, Vologda Oblast, a village in Vozhegodsky Selsoviet of Vozhegodsky District of Vologda Oblast